The DB Baureihe 120 is a class of electric locomotives operated by DB Fernverkehr in Germany. From 5 July 2020, almost all locomotives (except for one from the 120.2 subseries) have been withdrawn.

Background and design
The locomotives' prototypes, delivered in 1979 (Mark 120.0), were one of the first electric locomotives with three-phase motors controlled by thyristor-based power electronics. This principle, mainly devised by the german branch of swiss-based Brown, Boveri & Cie lay the foundation for all current electric and diesel-electric rail engines. For this, the Mark 120 is often acclaimed as milestone in locomotive technology. They were based on experiments made in the 1970s with diesel-electric test platforms (Mark DE 2500/ DB Mark 202).

The design was intended to be the first truly universal locomotive, capable of pulling fast passenger trains as well as heavy freight trains. While the electric equipment exceeded expectations, the mechanical part suffered from its lightweight construction necessitated by the heavy electronics of the time.

After extensive tests, a series of 60 locomotives (Mark 120.1) were ordered in 1984 and delivered in 1986–1988. Original plans to build up to 2,000 machines were ultimately ended by DB's privatisation. The 120s went to DB Fernverkehr, the other divisions of Deutsche Bahn ordered locomotives that featured technologies from the 120, but were not direct successors. However, the mark 120 engines formed the foundation for the power cars of the german high-speed trains ICE 1 and ICE 2

Technical data

Gallery

External links

 Spec Sheet; French

Railway locomotives introduced in 1979
Electric locomotives of Germany
15 kV AC locomotives
Bo′Bo′ locomotives
120
Brown, Boveri & Cie locomotives
Henschel locomotives
Krauss-Maffei locomotives
Krupp locomotives
Standard gauge locomotives of Germany